Township 6 can refer to:
Township 6, Harper County, Kansas
Township 6, Washington County, Nebraska